Martens (born June 1, 1976 in Vancouver, British Columbia) was a Canadian rhythmic gymnast who went on to found the only rhythmic gymnastics club in the Okanagan valley (BC, Canada).  As one of the only Canadian born coaches producing International level athletes.  As of 2022 Camille has produced 22 members of the Canadian High Performance National Team Pool (2000-2022) and National Champions at every level.  Her athletes have won medals at Jr. Pan Am Games, Pan Am Senior Championships, Pacific Rim Championships (junior and senior) and many International Invitationals.  In addition, her athletes have participated in World Championships, Grand Prix and World Cup events. She also founded the Cirque Theatre Company and has written, directed and produced over 20 original productions.  Her club is known for its positive culture and whole person approach and is a leading example of safe sport and True Sport qualities.

Camille is the mother of two adult children and resides in Vernon, British Columbia, Canada.  In 2022 she married French Snowboarder Benoit Lafon.

As an athlete, Martens won medals at Junior Pan Ams (1990), Four Continents Championships (1990, 1992, 1994) and ranked 21st at the 1993 World Championships in Alicante, Spain.  She competed in the 1994 Commonwealth Games where she was Canada’s most medaled athlete of the games (1 gold, 3 silver, 1 bronze).  She competed at the rhythmic gymnastics individual all-around competition at the 1996 Summer Olympics in Atlanta. There, while battling injury she was 33rd in the qualification round.

References

External links 
 
 

1976 births
Living people
Canadian rhythmic gymnasts
Gymnasts at the 1996 Summer Olympics
Olympic gymnasts of Canada
Sportspeople from Vancouver
Commonwealth Games medallists in gymnastics
Commonwealth Games gold medallists for Canada
Commonwealth Games silver medallists for Canada
Gymnasts at the 1994 Commonwealth Games
20th-century Canadian women
21st-century Canadian women
Medallists at the 1994 Commonwealth Games